Tobie Bayard Mimboe (sometimes referred to as Toby Mimboe), is a Cameroonian former professional footballer who played as a defender and spent most of his career in South America. He was capped for the Cameroon national team, and participated in two African Cup of Nations, in the 1996 African Cup of Nations, and 1998 African Cup of Nations

Career
Mimboe started in Cameroonian team Olympic Mvolyé. In his long career, he played in Paraguay for Deportivo Recoleta, Atlético Colegiales, Sportivo Luqueño, 12 de Octubre and Cerro Porteño, in Turkey for Gençlerbirliği, in Argentina for San Lorenzo, in Bolivia for The Strongest and in China for Shenyang Haishi. He is best remembered for his 'Peter Pan' birth certificates. At the 1996 African Cup of Nations he would have been 31 had he used the same documents that he had used in South America which indicated he was born in 1964. When he joined Gençlerbirliği after that tournament, his documents revealed him to be in his twenties (30 June 1974). At the 1998 African Cup of Nations he gave the date of birth as 30 June 1970.

Deportivo Recoleta
In 1993, Mimboe joined Deportivo Recoleta, scoring 1 goal in 20 games.

Atlético Colegiales
In 1994, Mimboe played for Atlético Colegiales, scoring 2 goals in 15 appearances.

12 de Octubre
In 1995, he scored 5 goals in 35 appearances for 12 de Octubre.

Cerro Porteño
In 1996, Mimboe joined Cerro Porteño, for whom he made 17 appearances and won the Paraguay's first-tier Championship. Mimboe joined a squad with players as Virgilio Ferreira, Diego Gavilan, Julio Enciso, Jorge Martin Núñez and Kenyan William Inganga.

Deportivo Recoleta
In 2002, Mimboe returned to Deportivo Recoleta, making 11 appearances. In July 2002, Mimboe protagonized the closest chance for goal for Deportivo Recoleta as they were defeated 2–0 by Libertad. In August 2002, Recoleta coach Pedro Nelson Fleitas decided to give continuity to Mimboe in the defence zone. In September 2002, passed his position following a muscular injury, after starting in 11 games for Recoleta.

Sportivo Luqueño
In 2004, Mimboe joined Sportivo Luqueño, playing in 12 games. On 14 March, Mimboe scored for Sportivo Luqueño in a 1–1 home draw against Club Nacional.

See also
 List of expatriate footballers in Paraguay
 Players and Records in Paraguayan Football

References

External links
 Tobie Mimboe at Playmakerstats.com
 

1964 births
Living people
Footballers from Yaoundé
Cameroonian footballers
Association football defenders
Cameroon international footballers
1996 African Cup of Nations players
1998 African Cup of Nations players
Paraguayan Primera División players
Argentine Primera División players
Süper Lig players
The Strongest players
Gençlerbirliği S.K. footballers
San Lorenzo de Almagro footballers
Cerro Porteño players
Sportivo Luqueño players
12 de Octubre Football Club players
Cameroonian expatriate footballers
Cameroonian expatriate sportspeople in Argentina
Expatriate footballers in Argentina
Cameroonian expatriate sportspeople in Paraguay
Expatriate footballers in Paraguay
Cameroonian expatriate sportspeople in Turkey
Expatriate footballers in Turkey
Cameroonian expatriate sportspeople in Bolivia
Expatriate footballers in Bolivia
Cameroonian expatriate sportspeople in China
Expatriate footballers in China